Plangia is a genus of insect in family Tettigoniidae, commonly known as Bush crickets or Katydids. In Afrikaans they are generally known as krompokkels, roughly meaning "little fat hunchbacks"; this name refers to their arched dorsal profile. The genus is indigenous to Sub-Saharan Africa.  It includes the following species:

 Plangia albolineata
 Plangia deminuta
 Plangia compressa
 Plangia graminea
 Plangia guttatipennis
 Plangia karschi
 Plangia laminifera
 Plangia nebulosa
 Plangia ovalifolia
 Plangia segonoides
 Plangia unimaculata
 Plangia venata
 Plangia villiersi

Description 

Typical Plangia species are moderate-sized katydids, fairly effective green leaf mimics, that lay their fairly large, flattened oval eggs under bark, or in individual incisions in the edges of leaves of their food plants. They make the incisions into the leaf parenchyma, between, and parallel to, the dorsal and ventral leaf epidermis. The ovipositor is specialised for the purpose and it has a peculiar shape rather like the curved blade of a field hockey stick. In this respect the ovipositor differs from most other katydids, that tend to have straight, sometimes very long, ovipositors.

The best-known pest species is Plangia graminea, a lightly built katydid; it is not of much commercial or agricultural importance, seldom worth controlling, but sometimes causes damage to foliage in vineyards and gardens.

References 

Phaneropterinae
Tettigoniidae genera